The 2015–16 Biathlon World Cup – Mass start Women started on Sunday December 20, 2015 in Pokljuka and will finish on Sunday March 20, 2016 in Khanty-Mansiysk. The defending titlist is Franziska Preuß of Germany.

Competition format
World Cup Mass starts are held with only the 30 top ranking athletes on the start line. All biathletes start at the same time and the first across the finish line wins. As in sprint and pursuit, competitors must ski one 150 metres (490 ft) penalty loop for each miss.

2014-15 Top 3 Standings

Medal winners

Standings

References

Mass start Women